The M1 Combat Car, officially Light Tank, M1, was a light tank used by the U.S. Cavalry in the late 1930s and developed at the same time as the infantry's very similar M2 light tank. After the Spanish Civil War, most armies, (including the U.S. Army), realized that they needed tanks armed with cannons, not merely vehicles armed with machine guns, and so the M1 became obsolete.

History and development
The National Defense Act of 1920 set tanks as the responsibility of the infantry and the general staff defined the purpose of tanks as the support of infantry units. Light tanks were defined as weighing five tons or less – so they could be carried by trucks – and medium tanks no greater than 15 tons to meet bridge weight limits. With very tight restrictions on spending, tank development in the U.S. was limited to a couple of test vehicles a year. The mechanization of the army was promoted by General Douglas MacArthur (Chief of Staff of the US Army) who believed that the cavalry should have tanks for an exploiting role rather than acting in support of the infantry. To allow U.S. Army cavalry units to be equipped with armored fighting vehicles, the tanks developed for the cavalry were designated "combat cars".

In the mid-1930s, the Rock Island Arsenal built three experimental T2 light tanks inspired by the British Vickers 6-ton tank. At the same time, they built a light tank similar to the T2 for the cavalry – the T5 combat car. The only major difference between the two was that the T5 used vertical volute suspension while the T2 had leaf springs as on the Vickers. The T5 was developed further and the T5E2 was accepted for production as the "M1 combat car".

The M1 entered service in 1937. A change to the suspension so that the idler wheel rested on the ground ("trailing") increased the length of track in contact with the ground and improved the ride. Together with a different engine and improved turret, this produced the M2 combat car. In 1940, the distinction between infantry and cavalry tank units disappeared with the establishment of the armored force to manage all tanks in the U.S. Army. The "combat car" name was superfluous, and the cavalry unit tanks redesignated the M1 combat car as the "light tank M1A1" and the M2 combat car as the "light tank M1A2".

Service
The M1 was fielded by the Philippines military early on in WW2 during the Philippines campaigns of 1941-1942 when armored vehicles of all manner were needed. All M1s that served subsequently fell to enemy Japanese forces.

The M1 and M2 combat cars were not used in combat by the U.S. Army during World War II; though some were used for training purposes.

Variants
M1 – The original variant. Eighty-nine built.
M1E2 – The prototype for the M1A1
M1A1 – A new octagonal turret instead of a D-shaped one; increased distance between the wheel bogies; constant mesh gears; 17 were built in 1938.
M1A1E1 – Prototype of the M2 combat car. The engine was replaced by a Guiberson T-1020 diesel.
M2 – New Guiberson diesel engine and trailing idler. Thirty-four built.

See also

 SCR-189
 List of U.S. military vehicles by supply catalog designation
 List of U.S. military vehicles by model number
 M2 light tank
 T7 Combat Car

References
Notes

Citations

Bibliography

Further reading

External links

WWII vehicles
"Mobile Machine-Gun Nest Carries Five Guns" Popular Mechanics, September 1937
Tanks Encyclopedia article.

World War II light tanks
Interwar tanks of the United States
Light tanks of the United States
Light tanks of the interwar period
Military vehicles introduced in the 1930s